Montappone is a comune (municipality) in the Province of Fermo in the Italian region Marche, located about  south of Ancona and about  northwest of Ascoli Piceno. It is a very important centre for hat production.

Montappone borders the following municipalities: Falerone, Loro Piceno, Massa Fermana, Monte Vidon Corrado, Montegiorgio, Sant'Angelo in Pontano.

Demographic evolution

References

Cities and towns in the Marche